The Holocaust Memorial in Hyde Park, London, was the first public memorial in Great Britain dedicated to victims of the Holocaust. It lies to the east of the Serpentine Lake, in The Dell, an open-air area within the park. Since its unveiling in 1983 remembrance services have taken place at the memorial every year.

Construction and unveiling

The memorial was built in 1983, funded by the Board of Deputies of British Jews under the impetus of then-President Greville Janner, a Labour Party MP. It was designed by Mark Badger, Richard Seifert, Derek Lovejoy and partners. It was unveiling on 28 June 1983, during a service led by then-Environment Secretary Patrick Jenkin, Baron Jenkin of Roding. Attended by a crowd of 500 spectators including Sir Immanuel Jakobovits, Baron Jakobovits, Chief Rabbi of the United Hebrew Congregations of the Commonwealth, Jenkin described the memorial as "a reminder of the past and a warning for the future." The attending guests then sang hymns and "Adon Olam", a Sabbath hymn.

The then-shadow Environment Secretary Gerald Kaufman, whose grandmother was murdered by the Nazis in Poland, also stated that "the memorial was essential because the German responsibility was partly shared by other countries."

Design

The memorial consists of two boulders lying within a gravel bed, surrounded by a copse of silver birch trees. It is inscribed in both English and Hebrew with the words "For these I weep. Streams of tears flow from my eyes because of the destruction of my people" which is a quotation from the Book of Lamentations.

See also
 List of Holocaust memorials and museums
 Proposed UK Holocaust Memorial in Victoria Gardens, Westminster.
 The Imperial War Museum Holocaust Exhibition in London
 The Wiener Library for the Study of the Holocaust and Genocide (London)

References

Notes

Written works

External links

 Monuments in Hyde Park RoyalParks.org
 Holocaust Memorial Garden, Hyde Park, London from 6millionmemorials.co.uk

Holocaust memorials
Monuments and memorials in London
Hyde Park, London
The Holocaust and the United Kingdom
Buildings and structures completed in 1983
Buildings and structures in Hyde Park, London